Henrietta "Etta" Bond is a British singer-songwriter. She was the first signing to OddChild Music, partially owing to Bond becoming friends with Labrinth thanks to a fluke Myspace encounter.

Career
Writing material for her debut release, Bond worked with producer DaVinChe – having already uploaded the demo singles "Ask Me to Stay" and "Come Over". Credited as Henrietta, she appeared on DaVinChe's song "No Significance", which was also featured on the 4.3.2.1. film soundtrack. Bond also made an appearance on British rapper Wretch 32's second studio album, Black and White, on the track "Forgiveness" – which was released on 11 December 2011 as a single.

Bond and fellow OddChild signing Raf Riley (who's also had releases with Mad Decent) released a free collaboration EP on 20 July 2012 under the name Emergency Room, featuring the previously unreleased demo "Ask Me To Stay" alongside 7 other tracks, including the single "Boring Bitches", featuring Lady Leshurr. The video was produced by Reuben Dangoor alongside the EP artwork, and received mixed opinions due to the controversial content shown in the video.

The EP received support from many notable artists, including Labrinth, Diplo, Professor Green and Mike Skinner among others. "Resolve" was released in the form of a promotional video in December 2012. Both the video and artwork again made by Dangoor.

On 26 July 2013, ExR released the music video for "Big Girl's Vogue", the first promotional single from their second EP Meds. The eight-track EP was released for free download on 8 August 2013. The duo appeared on DJ Target's BBC Radio 1Xtra show on 13 August 2013 to promote the EP. They also appeared on CJ Beatz' "Soundcheck Special" to perform "Loophole" on 1Xtra on 9 September 2013. On 30 September 2013, they appeared on Rinse FM to perform "Break Free".

On 13 October 2014, Bond released her third extended play, entitled #CoolUrbanNewTalent. The release was her first solo EP, and features collaborations with Raf Riley and Delilah. As a follow up to #CoolUrbanNewTalent Etta released her first single '18' featuring Etta's old lady alter ego who is 'growing old disgracefully' produced by MNEK. The video of '18' was released on 10 July 2015. Etta is currently working on new music with Raf Riley, Wilkinson, Mojam, Fred Ball (producer) and Naughty Boy.

Etta cites Labrinth, Jill Scott, Amy Winehouse, Erykah Badu, Michael Jackson, J Dilla and D'Angelo as major influences.

Discography

Extended plays

Singles

As lead artist

As featured artist

Other appearances

Remixes

Unreleased tracks

Music videos

References

1989 births
Living people
English women singers
English soul singers